Hugh Hyacinth O'Rorke MacDermot, Prince of Coolavin PC, JP, DL, QC (1 July 1834 – 6 February 1904), was an Irish lawyer.

Political and legal career
MacDermot served as Solicitor-General for Ireland in the Liberal government of 1886. He unsuccessfully contested the parliamentary constituency of West Derbyshire at the 1892 United Kingdom general election. He served as Attorney-General for Ireland in 1892, when he was made a member of the Irish Privy Council.

Personal life
MacDermot was the eldest son of Charles Joseph MacDermot by his wife Arabella Mary, only child of Hyacinth O'Rorke, representative of the House of O'Rorke of Breffny. He succeeded his father 5 September 1873 as The Mac Dermot, Prince of Coolavin. 

MacDermot died on 6 February 1904, and was succeeded by his eldest son, Charles Edward MacDermot. 
His grandson (by his fourth son, Henry) Niall MacDermot was a British Labour MP and junior minister between 1957 and 1970. His youngest son, Frank MacDermot, served as a member of both Dáil Éireann and Seanad Éireann between 1932 and 1942.

See also
 Chiefs of the Name
 Kings of Moylurg

Notes

References

 "Mac Dermot of Moylurg: The Story of a Connacht Family", Dermot Mac Dermot, 1996.
 Welcome To The Official MacDermot Clan Homepage at www.macdermot.com
Burke's Landed Gentry of Ireland

Solicitors-General for Ireland
Attorneys-General for Ireland
1834 births
1904 deaths
People from County Roscommon
MacDermot family
Members of the Privy Council of Ireland
Irish chiefs of the name